RS may refer to:

Businesses and organizations
 RS Group, entertainment & media company in Thailand
 RS Group plc, British electronics & industrial distributor in England with brands including RS Components and RS Americas, Inc
 RS Infotainment, Indian film production and distribution company
 RS Productions, defunct Australian television and radio production company
 Relief Society, an official auxiliary of The Church of Jesus Christ of Latter-day Saints (LDS Church)
 République solidaire, a French political party
 Roberval and Saguenay Railway (reporting mark RS)
 Russian Party (Serbia) (Ruska stranka), a political party in Serbia

Sport
 RS Sailing, an international designer and builder of sailboats and dinghies 
 Ford Team RS, Ford Motor Company's European performance car and motorsport division
 Renault Sport, performance and motorsport division of automobile manufacturer Renault
 Queens Park Rangers F.C., a professional football club from Shepherd's Bush, London, commonly nicknamed 'The Rs'

Places
 Republic of Serbia (ISO 3166-1 code RS), country 
 Republic of Slovenia, country
 Republika Srpska, one of the two political entities that compose the state of Bosnia and Herzegovina
 Republika Srpska (1992–1995)
 Rio Grande do Sul (ISO 3166-2 code BR-RS), Brazilian state

Science and technology
 R/S classification, of the chirality of a molecule
 RS, a class of racemic mixture
 Radio Science, an instrument aboard MESSENGER space probe
 Remote sensing
 Risk and Safety Statements (R/S statements), a system of hazard codes and phrases for labeling dangerous chemicals

Biology and medicine
 Resistant starch, indigestible starches (and sugars from starches)
 Roemheld syndrome, a complex of gastrocardiac symptoms
 Stomatal resistance (rs), of leaves
 rs, prefix of a DbSNP record ID number e.g. rs206437

Computing
 .rs, the internet country code top-level domain for Republic of Serbia
 .rs, a filename extension for Rust source code
 Recommended Standard (EIA), e.g. RS-232
 Record Separator, in the C0 control code
 Reed–Solomon error correction

Vehicles
 Rally Sport, a designation applied to rallying cars
  (German for "racing sport"), a designation used for cars such as the Audi RS models
 Porsche 911 Carrera RS
 Porsche 911 GT3 RS

Other uses
 Pakistani rupee (plural currency symbol Rs) 
 RS (rapper) (2000–2019), Dutch drill rapper
 Report Short, a type of US Congressional Research Service Report
 Retail services specialist, an occupational rating in the U.S. Navy